Hornafjörður Airport or Hornafjordur Airport  is an airport serving Höfn, Iceland.

The Hornafjordur non-directional beacon (Ident: HN) is located 1.24 nautical miles off the threshold of runway 36.

Airlines and destinations

Statistics

Passengers and movements

See also 
 Transport in Iceland
 List of airports in Iceland

Notes

References

External links 
 
 OpenStreetMap - Hornafjörður
 OurAirports - Hornafjörður
 Helipaddy BIHN

Airports in Iceland